Šibenik (pennant number RTOP-21) is a  missile boat in service with the Croatian Navy. It was built for the Yugoslav Navy at the Kraljevica Shipyard in the 1970s as Vlado Ćetković (RTOP-402). In 1991 during the early stages of the Croatian War of Independence it was captured by Croatian forces while being overhauled at the "Velimir Škorpik" shipyard in Šibenik.

Design and construction 
Šibenik was launched as Vlado Ćetković (RTOP-402) on 20 August 1977 as the second ship in a class of six missile boats that were being built at the Tito's Kraljevica Shipyard for the Yugoslav Navy (Jugoslavenska ratna mornarica – JRM). It was commissioned with the JRM in March 1978. The ship measures  in length, with a  beam and  draught. Propulsion utilizes a CODAG arangament with  two MTU 16V 538 TB91 diesel engines used for economical cruising whilst two RR Marine Proteus 52 M gas turbines are used for achieving higher speeds. Endurance is between five and seven days.

Due to changes carried out during its service, Šibenik features different armament than other ships of its class.

Service history 
Just before the Breakup of Yugoslavia, Vlado Ćetković and Rade Končar (RTOP-401) were modified by removing the 57 mm Mk.1 Bofors on their sterns and installing a Soviet made AK-630 CIWS. As the war started gaining momentum, shipyard workers and the Croatian forces managed to protect the ship from the retreating Yugoslav Navy ships and personnel. On September 28, 1991 the former RTOP-402 was commissioned with the newly formed Croatian Navy as RTOP-21 Šibenik with Robert Hranj in command.

During 1993-1994 Šibenik underwent a second weapons configuration change that removed the two P-20 missiles as its main armament, installing new RBS-15s that were acquired by the Yugoslav Navy just before the start of the war, enabling it to carry two or four missile. On October 12, 1994 Šibenik along with RTOP-11 Kralj Petar Krešimir IV. took part in the live fire exercise "Posejdon '94". Šibenik, now under the command of Predrag Stipanović, fired a single missile successfully destroying a decommissioned landing craft.

See also 
List of active Croatian Navy ships
List of ships of the Yugoslav Navy

References

Literature 

1977 ships
Ships built in Yugoslavia
Missile boats of the Croatian Navy
Missile boats of the Yugoslav Navy
Captured ships